R. Pattanam is a village in Rasipuram taluk, Namakkal district, Tamil Nadu, India. The residents' major occupation is agriculture. Here it has two lakes Pattanam lake which is largest lake in Rasipuram taluk and alathoor lake. Both collect the rain water through canal from the bodhamalai hills.

References

 Tamil Nadu Government - Namakkal District - Rasipuram Taluk
 List of Polling Station for Rasipuram Assembly Segment

Villages in Namakkal district